Julie Charon Engelbrecht (born 30 June 1984) is a French-born German actress.

Early life 
Engelbrecht was born in Paris. She is the daughter of the actress Constanze Engelbrecht, and made her acting debut at 12 years old, appearing with her mother in the 1996 TV film Adieu, mon ami. From 2004 to 2007, she attended Hochschule für Musik und Theater Hamburg.

Career 
Engelbrecht gained recognition for her role as Valerie Ulmendorff in the 2005–2006 miniseries Mutig in die neuen Zeiten, for which she received a 2007 Undine Award nomination for "Best Young Actress in a TV film".

In 2008, she played Johanna Palmquist in the TV movie Rasmus and Johanna, based on the Inga Lindström series, and Ilse in the 2008 film The Red Baron.

In 2009, she appeared as the high jumper Elisabeth 'Lilly' Vogt in Kaspar Heidelbach's film Berlin 36, and also in 2009, she starred as Müllerstochter Lisa in the ARD adaptation  alongside Robert Stadlober.

In 2011, she played Maren Elkberg in the TV film Die Hochzeit meines Mannes, also based on the Inga Lindström series, and followed with her role as the young ballerina Anna Castell in the film Die Tänzerin – Lebe deinen Traum.

In 2015, she played the lead role in the video for Anna Naklab and Alle Farben's single "Supergirl".

In 2015, she was cast and appeared in the role of the Witch Queen in The Last Witch Hunter.

Filmography

Television 
 Adieu, mon ami (1996), as Young Dagmar
 Zwei Profis: ...und das tote Mädchen (2003), as Cora Schenk
 Klassentreffen (2004), as Nena
 Tatort: Ein Glücksgefühl (2005), as Natalie Bracault
 Mutig in die neuen Zeiten: Im Reich der Reblaus (2005), as Valerie Ulmendorff
 Mutig in die neuen Zeiten: Nur keine Wellen (2006), as Valerie Ulmendorff
 Im Namen des Gesetzes: Der Tote am See (2008), as Nele Thieme
 Inga Lindström: Rasmus and Johanna (2008), as Johanna Palmquist
  (2009), as Lisa the miller's daughter
  (2009), as Gilla
 Alarm für Cobra 11 - Die Autobahnpolizei (2 episodes, 2010-2017), as Charlotte 'Summer' Schrankmann / Claudia Brandt
 Schief gewickelt (2010)
 Küstenwache (2 episodes, 2009–2011), as Gesa Hufeland
 Countdown – Die Jagd beginnt (1 episode, 2011), as Lena Walther
 Wilde Wellen – Nichts bleibt verborgen (2 episodes, 2011), as Sara
 Inga Lindström: Die Hochzeit meines Mannes (2011), as Maren Elkberg
 Die Harald Schmidt Show (1 episode, 2011), as Herself
 The Strain (1 episode, 2015), as Helga Richtler
 For Heaven's Sake (1 episode, 2020), as Eva Angermeier
 Homeland (1 episode, 2020), as Young Anna

Film 
 Before the Fall (2004), as Katharina
 The Red Baron (2008), as Ilse
 Berlin 36 (2009), as Elisabeth 'Lilly' Vogt
 Die Tänzerin – Lebe deinen Traum (aka Born to Dance) (2011), as Anna Castell
 45 Minutes to Ramallah (2013), as Olga
 Frei (2014), as Eva
 Barbecue (2014), as Julie
 Die Mamba (2014), as Agent Tripple D
 Nicholas on Holiday (2014), as La jeune Allemande
 The Last Witch Hunter (2015), as Witch Queen
 Beyond Valkyrie: Dawn of the 4th Reich (2016), as Elke Schroeder
 Ein Sommer in Südfrankreich (2016), as Charlotte

Recognition 
 2007, Undine Award nomination for "Best Young Actress in a TV Movie" for Mutig in die neuen Zeiten

References

External links 
 

1984 births
German film actresses
French film actresses
Actresses from Paris
Living people
Hochschule für Musik und Theater Hamburg alumni
German television actresses
French television actresses
21st-century French actresses
21st-century German actresses
French expatriates in Germany